Robert Michael Kitchin  is an Irish geographer and academic. Since 2005, he has been Professor of Human Geography at the National University of Ireland, Maynooth.

Education and career 
Kitchin graduated from Lancaster University in 1991 with a geography BSc. The following year, he completed an MSc in geographical information systems at the University of Leicester and in 1995 was awarded a PhD by the University of Wales, Swansea, for his thesis "Issues of validity and integrity in cognitive mapping research: investigating configurational knowledge". From 1995 to 1996, he was a lecturer at Swansea, and was then a lecturer at Queen's University Belfast (1996 to 1998). In 1998, he was appointed a lecturer at the National University of Ireland, Maynooth, and was promoted to a senior lecturership in 2001. He was then appointed Professor of Human Geography in 2005. Between 2002 and 2013, he was also Director of NUI Maynooth's National Institute of Regional and Spatial Analysis. He is Co-Editor-in-Chief of the International Encyclopedia of Human Geography.

Honours 
In 2013, Kitchin received the Royal Irish Academy's Gold Medal. In 2015, he was elected a Member of the Royal Irish Academy.

Publications 

 Cyberspace: The World in the Wires (John Wiley and Sons, 1998).
 (Co-authored with Nick Tate) Conducting Research in Human Geography: Theory, Methodology and Practice (Prentice Hall. 1999).
 Disability, Space and Society. Changing Geography Series (Geographical Association, 2000).
 (Co-authored with Martin Dodge) Mapping Cyberspace (Routledge, 2000).
 (Co-authored with Mark Blades) The Cognition of Geographic Space (I.B. Tauris, 2001).
 (Co-authored with Martin Dodge) Atlas of Cyberspace. (Addison-Wesley, 2001).
 (Co-authored with Phil Hubbard, Brendan Bartley and Duncan Fuller) Thinking Geographically: Space, Theory and Contemporary Human Geography (Continuum, 2002).
 (Co-authored with Duncan Fuller) The Academic’s Guide to Publishing (Sage, 2005).
 (Co-authored with Justin Gleeson, Brendan Bartley, John Driscoll, Ronan Foley, Stewart Fotheringham and Chris Lloyd) The Atlas of the Island of Ireland (AIRO/ICLRD, 2008).
 Code/Space: Software and Everyday Life (MIT Press, 2011).
 (Co-authored with Noel Castree and Alisdair  Rogers) A Dictionary of Human Geography (Oxford University Press, 2013).
 The Data Revolution: Big Data, Open Data, Data Infrastructures and Their Consequences (Sage, 2014).

References 

British geographers
Alumni of Lancaster University
Alumni of the University of Leicester
Alumni of Swansea University
Academics of Swansea University
Academics of Queen's University Belfast
Academics of Maynooth University
Members of the Royal Irish Academy
Year of birth missing (living people)
Living people